Oil Industries’ Commissioning and Operation Company (OICO;  Sherkat-e Rāhandāzi va Bahrebardāri-ye Sanāye-e Naft) is an Iranian company in the field of Oil & Gas which is incorporated to manage and execute commissioning and start-up, operation, maintenance and training courses for oil, gas and petrochemical industries. OICO was established in 2011 as a private joint-stock company in Tehran.

The company is wholly-owned by and is a subsidiary of “Oil Industries Engineering and Construction” (OIEC) group and Oil Industry Pension Fund Investment Company (OPIC).

OICO invest in the area of training and human resources development, maintain qualified and skillful expert and relies on them to execute pre-commissioning, commissioning, start-up and performance test of oil, gas and petrochemical projects up to the client handover.

History 
The changing nature of oil, gas and petrochemical industries and the added complexities of new projects, compel Iranian companies to upgrade their capabilities and acquire new and systematic approaches to ensure the successful implementation of their projects. On the other hand, necessitate the adaptation of new approaches in management, construction, pre-commissioning and commissioning aspects of oil, gas and petrochemical projects.

Prior to establishment of OICO, OIEC executed commissioning and start-up activities in the South Pars gas field development phases 9 & 10 through its own commissioning department. Due to the expansion of OIEC’s projects and higher demand for commissioning and start-up services, OIEC made a strategic decision to establish a subsidiary in the field of commissioning and operation. This new company was named “OICO”.

OICO was established in 2011. OICO’s relying on a custom-made methodology executed pre-commissioning and commissioning in the arena.

The operational zone 
The domain of OICO services contains a wide range. Ilam to Dehloran in west , Asaluyeh to Kangan in the southwest, Bandar Abbas and Sirri island in the south of Iran.

References

External links
 OIEC to launch feasibility study for development of Sepehr field Islamic Republic News Agency.11 June 2016
 Oil Industries’ Commissioning and Operation Company (OICO) http://www.ecasb.com/ 
 Oil Industries Commissioning and Operation (OICO) http://www.oiecgroup.com/
 Oil Industries Commissioning and Operation Co Profile https://www.decypha.com/

Iran
Oil and gas companies of Iran